Tillandsia lorentziana is a species in the genus Tillandsia. This species is native to Bolivia and Brazil.

References

lorentziana
Flora of Bolivia
Flora of Brazil